The women's high jump event at the 2015 Summer Universiade was held on 12 July at the Gwangju Universiade Main Stadium.

Results

References

High
2015 in women's athletics
2015